Bloom or blooming may refer to:

Science and technology

Biology 
 Bloom, one or more flowers on a flowering plant
 Algal bloom, a rapid increase or accumulation in the population of algae in an aquatic system
 Jellyfish bloom, a collective noun for a large group of jellyfish
 Epicuticular wax bloom, a whitish haze due to small crystals of wax, occurring on the surface of many fruits
 Bloom syndrome, an autosomal recessive human genetic disorder that predisposes the patient to a wide variety of cancer

Computing 
 Bloom filter, a probabilistic method to find a subset of a given set
 Bloom (shader effect), a graphics effect used in modern 3D computer games
 Bloom (software), a generative music application for the iPhone and iPod Touch
 BLOOM (language model), an open-source language model

Art conservation 
 Wax bloom, an efflorescence of wax or stearic acid affecting oil pastels
 Saponification in art conservation, a chalky white efflorescence on old oil paintings
 Bloom, pigment migration from wetter to drier surfaces of a watercolor painting

Other science and technology 
 Bloom (bloomery) (sponge iron), a porous mass of iron and slag produced in a bloomery
 Bloom (casting), a semi-finished metal casting
 Bloom (sulfur), the migration of sulfur to the exterior of a rubber
 Bloom (test), a test to measure the strength of a gel or gelatin
 Blooming (CCD), an effect that happens when a pixel in a CCD image sensor is overloaded
 Blooming (directed-energy weapon), an effect of laser beams and particle beams in the air
 Chocolate bloom, the appearance of white coating on chocolate
 Thermal blooming, an atmospheric effect on high-energy laser beams

People 
 Bloom (surname)

Places

United States 
 Bloom, Colorado, a ghost town
 Bloom, Kansas, an unincorporated community
 Bloom, Wisconsin, a town
 Bloom City, Wisconsin, an unincorporated community
 Blooming, Oregon, an unincorporated community
 Bloom Creek (disambiguation)
 Bloom's Lake, a lake in Minnesota
 Bloom Township (disambiguation)

Arts and entertainment 
 Bloom (novel), a 1998 science fiction novel by Wil McCarthy
 Bloom (2003 film), award-winning Irish film
 Bloom (2021 film), a 2021 Tamil short film
 Bloom (TV series), a 2019 Australian TV series
 Bloom (Winx Club), the main character of the Winx Club animated series
 Bloom County, American comic strip by Berkeley Breathed
 The Brothers Bloom, a 2009 movie
 Bloom.fm, a former music application and streaming service
 Bloom (music venue), an alternative music club in Mezzago, Italy
 Bloom (mod), 2019 game mod created by Bloom Team

Music

Artists 
 Bloom, one of the many stage names of Dutch singer Bloem de Ligny
 Bloom 06, Italian electronic duo

Albums 

 Bloom (Billy Pilgrim album), 1995
 Bloom (Audio Adrenaline album), 1996
 Bloom (Tasmin Archer album), 1996
 Bloom (Beach House album), 2012
 Bloom (Caligula's Horse album), 2015
 Bloom (Jeff Coffin album), 2005
 Bloom (Gabriel & Dresden album), 2004
 Bloom (Eric Johnson album), 2005
 Bloom (Lights & Motion album), 2018
 Bloom (Machine Gun Kelly album), 2017
 Bloom (The McDades album), 2006
 Bloom (Lou Rhodes album), 2007
 Bloom (RÜFÜS album), 2016
 Bloom (Troye Sivan album), 2018
 Bloom (G.NA EP), 2012
 Bloom (Of Mice & Men EP), 2021
 Bloom (Red Velvet album), 2022
 Blooming (album), album by Ami Suzuki, 2010

Songs 
 "Bloom" (The Paper Kites song), 2010
 "Bloom" (Gain song), 2012
 "Bloom" (Troye Sivan song), 2018
 "Bloom", by Between the Buried and Me from The Parallax II: Future Sequence, 2012
 "Bloom", by Caligula's horse from Bloom, 2015
 "Bloom (Return to Dust)", by Code Orange from Love Is Love/Return to Dust, 2012
 "Bloom", by Gigolo Aunts from Full-On Bloom, 1991
 "Bloom", by Radiohead from The King of Limbs, 2011
 "(ocean) bloom", Radiohead and Hans Zimmer's 2017 reworking of the song that was recorded for television series Blue Planet II
 "Bloom", by Scale the Summit from Carving Desert Canyons, 2009
 "Bloom", by Turnover from Magnolia, 2013
 "Blooming", by Band-Maid from Conqueror, 2019

Organisations 
 Bloom (store), a US supermarket chain operated by Food Lion LLC
 Bloom Brothers Department Stores, a defunct chain of department stores in Pennsylvania and Maryland, US
 Bloom Festival, Ireland's largest gardening show
 Bloom's restaurant, England's longest-standing kosher restaurant
 Club Blooming, a football (soccer) club and academy from Santa Cruz de la Sierra, Bolivia

Other uses 
 Bloom's taxonomy, a classification of learning objectives
 "Blooming", a less offensive version of the expletive attributive bloody

See also 
 Blum (disambiguation)
 Blume (disambiguation)
 Bloomberg (disambiguation)
 Bloomfield (disambiguation)
 Blumenthal (disambiguation)
 Bloomer (disambiguation)